Black Spot is a French-Belgian television supernatural thriller that premiered on France 2 on 10 April 2017, following its debut in February at the 2017 Festival des créations télévisuelles de Luchon. Created by Mathieu Missoffe via co-production of Ego Productions, Be-Films, and RTBF, the series stars Suliane Brahim, Hubert Delattre, and Laurent Capelluto.

In November 2017, Amazon Prime acquired the rights to stream Season 1 globally outside of Denmark, Belgium, the Netherlands and Luxembourg — a first for any French series. A second season was commissioned by France 2 and was released globally on Netflix on June 14, 2019.

Plot
Police-Major Laurène Weiss is the head of the Gendarmerie (police) of her hometown of Villefranche, a small, isolated, fictional town surrounded by a  forest in the mountains. Prosecutor Franck Siriani arrives to learn why the town's murder rate is six times the national average; he also has an interest in investigating the major's clouded past. The forest is a strange and exceptionally dangerous place, in which many of the murders take place.

Cast

Episodes

Series 1 (2017)

Series 2

Notes

References

External links
 
 
 Black Spot at AlloCiné (in French)

2010s Belgian television series
2010s French drama television series
2010s crime drama television series
2010s supernatural television series
2017 Belgian television series debuts
2017 French television series debuts
Celtic mythology in popular culture
Crime thriller television series
France 2
France Télévisions original programming
French-language Netflix original programming
French LGBT-related television shows
French supernatural television series
Neo-noir television series
Vosges
French crime drama television series